The 1977–78 Hong Kong First Division League season was the 67th since its establishment.

League table

References
1977–78 Hong Kong First Division table (RSSSF)

Hong
Hong Kong First Division League seasons
football